The Order of the Red Banner was a military decoration of the Democratic Republic of Afghanistan. The medal had been awarded to Afghan citizens as well as foreigners and institutions for services to the state.

Overview 
The order was established on December 24, 1980. The grounds for the award were: feats performed in a combat situation and with a clear danger to life, outstanding combat leadership, excellent combat actions of military units and military formations, concrete successes in economic and cultural development. It was last awarded in 1992. Many soldiers who served in the Soviet–Afghan War were awarded the order.

Recipients 
 Dmitry Yazov
 Norat Ter-Grigoryants
 Boris Gromov
 Sergey Sokolov (marshal)
 Pavel Grachev
 Vladimir Kuznetsov
 15th Independent Special Forces Brigade
 Military Logistics Academy
 General Khushal Peroz

References 

Orders, decorations, and medals of Afghanistan
Courage awards
Awards established in 1980
1980 establishments in Afghanistan